Chama Cha Kijamii (CCK) is a political party in Tanzania.

References

2012 establishments in Tanzania
Political parties established in 2012
Political parties in Tanzania